The  is an automobile which was produced by Mazda from 1967 until 1995. Throughout its history, the Cosmo served as a "halo" vehicle for Mazda, with the first Cosmo successfully launching the Mazda Wankel engine. The final generation of Cosmo served as Mazda's flagship vehicle in Japan, being sold as the Eunos Cosmo through its luxury Eunos division in Japan.

Mazda chose to use the name "cosmo", reflecting international cultural fascination with the Space Race, as Mazda wanted to showcase the rotary engine as forward-thinking, with a focus on future developments and technology.

Series L10A/L10B (1967–1972) 

The first Mazda to bear the Cosmo name (called the 110S on models intended for export) was (along with the NSU Ro80) one of the first production cars to feature a 2-rotor Wankel engine. A prototype was presented at the 1964 Tokyo Motor Show, one month before the 1964 Summer Olympics, and after the introduction of the NSU Spider at the Frankfurt Motor Show; 80 pre-production Cosmos were produced for the Mazda test department (20) and for dealership testing (60) between 1965 and 1966. Full production began in May 1967 and lasted through 1972, though Cosmos were built by hand at a rate of only about one per day, for a total of 1,176 (343 Series I cars and 833 Series II cars). The car was also featured in the show The Return of Ultraman.

Cosmos were built in five batches:

Racing 
In 1968, Mazda went racing with the Cosmo. They selected one of the most grueling tests in Europe to prove the reliability of the rotary engine, the 84-hour Marathon de la Route at the legendary Nürburgring circuit in Germany. Two mostly stock Cosmos were entered, along with 58 other cars. One major change to the cars' 10A engines was the addition of a novel side- and peripheral-port intake system: A butterfly valve switched from the side to the peripheral port as RPMs increased. The engines were limited to 130 PS to improve durability.

The cars ran together in fourth and fifth place for most of the race, but the all-Japanese car was retired with axle damage in the 82nd hour. The other car, driven by Belgians, completed the race in fourth overall. This was to be the only racing outing for the Cosmo—the next Mazda race car would be a Familia Rotary (R100).

Series I 

The Series I/L10A Cosmo was powered by a 0810 two-rotor engine with 982 cc of displacement and produced about 110 hp (thus the 110S name used in export markets). It used a Hitachi four-barrel carburetor and an odd ignition design—two spark plugs per chamber with dual distributors. A four-speed manual transmission and 14-inch wheels were standard.

In Japan, the installation of a rotary engine gave Japanese buyers a financial advantage when it came time to pay the annual road tax in that they bought a car that was more powerful than a traditional inline engine, but without having the penalty for having an engine in the higher above-one-litre tax bracket.

The front suspension was a coil-sprung double-wishbone design with an anti-roll bar. The rear used a leaf-sprung de Dion tube. Unassisted 10 inch (254 mm) disk brakes were found in front with 7.9 inches (201 mm) drum brakes in the rear. Performance in the quarter-mile (400 m) was 16.4 s, with a 115 mph (185 km/h) top speed. The price was lower than the Toyota 2000GT at 1.48 million yen (US$4,100).

Series II 

The Series II/L10B was introduced in July 1968. It had a more-powerful 128 hp (95 kW)/103 lb·ft (140 N·m) 0813 engine, power brakes, 15 inch wheels and a 5-speed manual transmission. The wheelbase had been expanded by 15cm for more room and a better ride. This Cosmo was good for over 120 mph (193 km/h) and could accelerate to cover a quarter-mile (400 m) in 15.8 s.

Visual changes included a larger grille under the front bumper with two additional vents to each side of this "mouth". Only 833 were ever made, and fewer than six Series II models were initially imported into the United States. The price was up a bit to 1.48 million yen (US$4,390).

Comedian and former talk show host Jay Leno owns a 1970 Series II Cosmo which was featured on the North American Speed Channel series My Classic Car in March 2006. It was believed to be the only remaining Series II Cosmo in the United States, though the original Cosmo 10a engine was replaced with an RX-7 12a.

However, Mazda's U.S. division "found another in the garage of Phoenix-area car collector Glenn Roberts and made an offer that he couldn't refuse," according to Car and Driver magazine's September 2007 issue ("A Tale of Two Rotaries"). There is a Series II Cosmo in a collection in Alberta, Canada as well.

A 1970 Mazda Cosmo Sport Series II L10B Coupe sold in January 2015 for  inclusive premium at auction at Bonhams.

Series CD (1975–1981) 

The second generation CD Cosmo appeared in 1975 and lasted until 1981. It was known as the Cosmo AP (Anti-Pollution) in Japan, and sold internationally as the Mazda RX-5, though in some export markets its piston-powered counterpart was called the Mazda 121 (a name later applied to Mazda's subcompact model).

Mazda America used the Mazda Cosmo name and offered it from 1976 through 1978, after which the Cosmo was replaced by the Mazda RX-7 as their rotary-powered sports coupe. The CD Cosmo/RX-5 series was positioned as a personal luxury car, offered as a notchback coupe, called the Landau, which included an "opera window" and padded vinyl roof covering, that appeared to be influenced by the 1970s era Lincoln Continental. It was also available as a fastback, but neither body style found many international buyers. It was however an enormous success in Japan where over 55,000 were sold in the first year alone. This new body style competed with the Toyota Crown, Nissan Cedric, Nissan Gloria, and the Mitsubishi Galant Lambda coupes newly introduced to Japan.

Due to its poor sales as an export, the Series II version, built from 1979, was not exported and remained a Japanese domestic sale only. RX-4 exported to Europe saw very little competition in the rotary-engine equipped market, with the introduction of the short-lived Citroën GS Birotor, as well as any remaining NSU RO80 sedans.

The Cosmo was Mazda's largest rotary-powered coupe, based on the LA series Mazda Luce floor pan and mechanics, but slightly heavier due to body design and more luxurious appointments, including a five-link rear suspension and rear disc brakes. It was available with the 12A and 13B engines. This series Cosmo was joined by the short-lived Mazda Roadpacer, a large, heavy sedan powered only by a rotary engine.

The rotary engine had financial advantages to Japanese consumers in that the engine displacement remained below 1.5 liters, a significant determination when paying the Japanese annual road tax which kept the obligation affordable to most buyers, while having more power than the traditional inline engines.

Series HB (1981–1987) 

The third generation HB Cosmo from 1981 shared the Mazda HB chassis with its twin, the Mazda Luce (marketed overseas as the Mazda 929). The HB Cosmo was offered both as a coupe, and sedan, and was exported to Europe as the 929, alongside the Luce sedan, which shared the 929 export name. The HB Cosmo was the only car in automotive history to offer a choice of both Gasoline and Diesel piston engines and Rotary engines, and this was the last generation Cosmo to be exported.

The Cosmo sedan was a badge engineered version of the Luce sedan, with the Cosmo coupe and sedan sold at an exclusive dealership called Mazda Auto, while the Luce was available as a sedan only, sold at previously established Japanese Mazda dealerships. All Cosmo-branded vehicles were installed with rotary engines only, while the Luce offered rotary, and piston-driven engines. Later in 1991, Mazda Auto locations were renamed Eunos.

When the FC series Mazda Savanna RX-7 was introduced in 1986 internationally, this series Cosmo coupe retained its top position as Mazda's largest rotary powered personal luxury car, with a comfortable backseat, trunk, and every luxury amenity available, while adopting the retractable headlights from the RX-7.

Mazda offered three different rotary engines for the HB series. A 12A-6PI (for "six-port induction"), 12A-turbo and 13B-RESI, with all using electronic multiport fuel injection. The latter available with automatic transmission only. The 1982 12A-turbo Cosmo coupé was officially the fastest production car in Japan until being overtaken by the FJ20ET powered R30 Skyline RS.

The rotary engine had financial advantages to Japanese consumers in that the engine displacement remained below 1.5 litres, a significant determination when paying the Japanese annual road tax which kept the obligation affordable to most buyers, while having more power than the traditional inline engines.

The HB Cosmo & Luce names were used in Japan, with the 929 being the export version (which was not available with the rotary engine options). While the Luce was updated in 1986, the Cosmo variant remained in production at a trickle until 1989.

The Mazda 929 Turbo EGI (Electronic Gasoline Injection) Luxury was available in Australia from 1986 to May 1987 (with these later cars produced in 1986). It used the FET engine and came only with a manual transmission. Not all two-door 929 models used the FET, most used other variants of the FE engine, either Carburetor or EGI with optional four-speed automatic transmission. The 2.0 L (1998 cc) fuel injected, turbocharged FET version of the FE produced 135 hp (100 kW) and 175 lb·ft (237 N·m). It was a water cooled 8-valve SOHC engine featuring a small turbocharger, and no intercooler.

Series JC (Eunos Cosmo, 1990–1996) 

The Eunos Cosmo (loosely based on the 1985 MX-03 concept car) started production in 1990 on the new JC platform. The Eunos Cosmo was the top-line touring flagship of the Eunos luxury channel. It is the only Mazda to use a triple-rotor engine. The car was a 2+2 coupé and was loaded with power amenities. Following the Japanese luxury theme, only an electronically controlled 4-speed automatic transmission was available.

In Japan, its sole market, sales were affected by the fact that this series Cosmo no longer complied with Japanese government dimension regulations, and Japanese buyers were liable for yearly taxes for driving a larger car compared to previous generations. Compounding matters further was the Japanese asset price bubble burst.

Two engines were available, the twin turbo 13B-RE and the 20B-REW. The triple rotor 20B had 2 litres (1962 cc) of displacement, making it the largest capacity rotary offered for sale by Mazda.

The JC series Cosmo set several firsts in automotive history. Its 13B-RE and 20B-REW engines were the first Japanese built, series production twin sequential turbo systems to be offered for sale on a rotary engined car. The internationally known FD series RX-7 didn't receive the twin turbo 13B-REW engine until early 1992. The Eunos Cosmo was the first production car to have a built-in GPS navigation system, and the first in Japan to use the "Palmnet" serial data communication system for ECU-to-ECAT operation.

The fourth generation Cosmo was ahead of its time electronically as well by being offered with Car Communication System, a CRT colour touch-screen controlling climate control, mobile phone, GPS car navigation, NTSC TV, radio and CD player.

The JC Cosmo was expensive even by today's standards, as Mazda still has not matched the sales price of this car some 22 years later for anything else in its range.

The Cosmo was manufactured from February 1990 until September 1995, and gathered a total of 8,875 sales. A split of 60/40 sales between 13B-REW and 20B-REW variants made the triple rotor 20B-REW version a rarer car. Although the Cosmo remained a Japanese market-only vehicle (export had been proposed originally under the Eunos sales channel, and under the stillborn Amati brand in the USA), used Cosmos have found their way to various RHD countries thanks to import regulations for private importers from these countries. The Cosmo appears in Sega GT and in the Gran Turismo and Gran Turismo 2 games, as well as the arcade game series Wangan Midnight: Maximum Tune 1 through 6RR.

Dimensions
 Wheelbase: 
 Front Track: 
 Rear Track: 
 Length: 
 Width: 
 Weight: 

Engines
 JCESE  Series-I (90–93) – 20B
 JCES  Series-II (94–95) – 20B
 JC3SE  Series-I (90–93) – 13B
 JC3S  Series-II (94–95) – 13B

References

Notes

Bibliography

External links 

 MazdaCosmoSport.com – 1st Gen Mazda Cosmo Sport community
 New York Rotary Association – New Yorks Biggest Rotary Engine Auto Club (NYRA)
 Garage HB – 3rd Gen (81–89) Cosmo online community
 Cosmo retrospective from Classic Motorsports magazine
 Mazda Cosmo Sport 1100 – Carsguide Car of the Week
 Mazda Cosmo Sport Buyers Guide at Classic Motorsports

Cosmo
Grand tourers
Rear-wheel-drive vehicles
Cars powered by Wankel engines
Cars introduced in 1967
1970s cars
1980s cars
1990s cars